Jakub Habusta (born 3 May 1993) is a professional Czech football player who plays as a midfielder for Fotbal Třinec.

References

External links
 
 
 
 

1993 births
Living people
Czech footballers
Czech Republic youth international footballers
Czech Republic under-21 international footballers
Association football midfielders
Czech First League players
Czech National Football League players
I liga players
II liga players
SK Sigma Olomouc players
FK Frýdek-Místek players
SFC Opava players
Odra Opole players
GKS Katowice players
FK Fotbal Třinec players
Expatriate footballers in Poland
Czech expatriate footballers
Czech expatriate sportspeople in Poland